Xabier Pikaza Ibarrondo (born 12 June 1941 in Orozco, Spain) is a Spanish theologian of Liberation Theology and professor at Pontifical University of Salamanca.

He entered the Order of Mercy, within which he was ordained a presbyter of the Catholic Church. He studied theology at the Pontifical University of Salamanca, a discipline in which he received a doctorate from that university in 1965. He later received a doctorate in Philosophy from the Pontifical University of Saint Thomas Aquinas in Rome (1972) and specialized in biblical philology at the Pontifical Biblical Institute.

Teaching career 
In 1972 he began teaching at the Faculty of Theology at the University of Professional Studies, where he became a professor in 1975. In 1985 the Vatican Congregation for Seminars and University and the Congregation for the Doctrine of the Faith denied him the nihil obstat for his ideas on themes of dogmatic theology; therefore he cannot teach in universities of the Catholic Church. In 1989 he was granted the nihil obstat again but to teach phenomenology and History of Religions, not dogmatic theology. He resumed his work as a professor at UPSA until he was dismissed again for doctrinal problems in 2003. During this time he abandoned the mercedarian order and the priesthood, marrying María Isabel Pérez Pérez Chaves.

He has developed an enormous activity, from talks to dozens of books and articles published in magazines and encyclopedias. He was one of the 9 experts who were neither politicians, victims, witnesses, or state officials, which the Commission of Investigation of the attacks of March 11 in Madrid called to give his opinion and contribute his knowledge of the implications of this subject, and will evaluate it from your area of knowledge about religions.

References 

1941 births
Living people
20th-century Spanish Roman Catholic theologians
Pontifical University of Salamanca alumni
21st-century Spanish Roman Catholic theologians